Greenlane railway station serves the Southern Line and Onehunga Line of the Auckland railway network. It was opened circa 1877. It has an island platform and is reached via a ramp from Green Lane East. It is the nearest station to Ellerslie Racecourse, Greenlane Clinical Centre (formerly known as Greenlane Hospital), ASB Showgrounds and Cornwall Park.

Services
Auckland One Rail, on behalf of Auckland Transport, operates suburban services on the Southern Line and Onehunga Line. All Southern Line services stop at Greenlane. Since 26 August 2018, Onehunga Line services stop only in the evenings. The typical weekday off-peak timetable is:
3 tph to Britomart
3 tph to Papakura

Greenlane railway station is served by local bus route 650.

See also 
 List of Auckland railway stations

References 

Rail transport in Auckland
Railway stations in New Zealand